Sara Maria Forsberg (born 2 May 1994), known professionally as SAARA (formerly Smo, Smoukahontas, or Smokahontas), is a Finnish singer, songwriter, YouTube personality, and television presenter.  As a singer, Forsberg was signed to Capitol Records in 2014 and released her debut single "Ur Cool" in April 2015, which went on to become a top ten hit in her home country of Finland. She left in early 2016 after disagreements with the label and her producer. Forsberg has continued to release music as an independent artist in affiliation with Universal Music Group. As of November 2017, her YouTube channel has more than a million subscribers and over 100 million views.

Personal life 

Forsberg was born on 2 May 1994 in Jakobstad, Finland. Her father was born in Sweden. Forsberg has taken a DNA test with the following results: 63.8% Finnish, 28.7% Scandinavian, 5.5% Central American, and 2.0% Eastern European. Her native language is Finnish, although she spoke mainly English in the first six years of her life. Because of her parents' career as Baptist missionaries, she moved frequently as a child, living in Texas for five years and the United Kingdom for a year, before returning to Finland permanently. Forsberg spent a few years in a music academy in Jakobstad and later studied to become a chef before embarking on a singing career.

Career

Starting from Youtube

Since her video "What Languages Sound Like to Foreigners" was posted on YouTube on 3 March 2014 on her channel Smoukahontas Official (which subsequently has been changed into SAARA), it has been seen over 20 million times as of June 2018. Her ability to mimic accents and speech melodies of different languages, which included Japanese, Estuary English, American with California accent, Swedish, French, Arabic and Spanish, using mainly nonexistent words, was praised by media in a number of countries.

In the first sequel, she re-impersonated some of the languages from the initial video and added new ones, including "Something African" and "Scottish". In another sequel, her "One Girl, 14 Genres" video, a number of musical genres were mimicked.

Musical career 

In July 2014, it was revealed that Forsberg had signed a record deal with Capitol Records with Rodney Jerkins acting as her executive producer. Capitol Records chairman and CEO Steve Barnett said that the only artists that he had the same feeling about other than Forsberg were Adele and Sam Smith. She is the first Finnish person to be signed to a major American record label. Her debut single "Ur Cool" was released on 21 April 2015 and became a Top 10 single in Finland. In February 2016, Forsberg left Capitol Records. She told in her YouTube video that the producer Jerkins had left Capitol Records and she was left stranded, contractually not being allowed to work without him. Due to the unwillingness of the producer to let her out of the contract, Capitol Records agreed to terminate her contract and let her go create freely again. Saara also told in the video that she felt bad promoting a single she absolutely hated.

In April 2016 Saara's  manager Johannes Ylinen informed that Saara had signed with Universal Music Group, with which she would continue releasing music independently. Forsberg released her debut EP Hello I'm Saara on 27 May 2016. The EP's lead single, "The Urge", was released in June 2016. 
In 2017 Saara published 3 singles: In February "Permission to Love", in March "Superpowers" and in October the single ”All The Love ft. Jillionaire”.

On 2 May 2018, her birthday, Saara released her second album Almost Acoustic EP with four new songs and one remix. On the same day she also had her first YouTube live concert. 

Forsberg also writes music for other artists. In July 2015, it was revealed that Forsberg has writing credit for the K-Pop band Girls' Generation song "You Think" in their album Lion Heart. The song was charted on Billboard's digital song list at nr. 3 September 2015. In 2016 Sara co-wrote the song "My Heart Wants Me Dead" by Lisa Ajax for Melodifestivalen 2016, as well as the song "Drip Drop" by Taemin from his second solo album Press It.

In June 2015, she was featured on the song "Vauvoja" by Finnish singer Kasmir. The song went on to reach number-one on the Finnish downloads and airplay charts. In the summer of 2017 Saara was featured on the song "Can't Buy Love" by THRDL!FE.

In TV and films 

In April 2014 Sara Forsberg signed a development deal with production/distribution company Omnivision Entertainment/My Damn Channel. In May 2014, Forsberg relocated to Los Angeles to perform on a YouTube channel affiliated with My Damn Channel called "WestToastTV" in addition to maintaining her own personal channel.

In October 2014, it was revealed that Forsberg has a small role in the Hong Kong-Chinese-American film Skiptrace directed by Finnish director Renny Harlin.

In December 2015, the news broke that Forsberg had spent the last 18 months working with Lucasfilm and was the creator of the alien language used in Star Wars: The Force Awakens. In July 2016, it was revealed that Forsberg had created another alien language for a Hollywood film, this time for the film Star Trek Beyond, in which she has also a minor voice role as an alien named Kalara.

In 2016 Sara worked as a judge on the fifth season of Talent Suomi, the Finnish version of Got Talent. 2016 Forsberg also hosted the United Kingdom game show Remotely Funny.
On 5 February 2017 a new Finnish game show called Kaikki Vastaan 1 (Everyone Against 1) began airing live on Sunday evenings on the Finnish network, Nelonen TV, with Forsberg as a co-host. The first season ran until 9 April 2017. Also, in February 2017, Forsberg began hosting Remotely Funny, a British game show on CBBC.
In 2018 Saara went on appearing on Finnish TV, in spring on the contest Pallon Ympäri (Around The Globe), where she has been travelling around the world by performing tasks as one of the three competitors. She has been told to go on co-hosting again the studio contest Kaikki Vastaan 1 in autumn 2018.

In media 

Forsberg was interviewed on British BBC Radio, Finnish public radio Yle and Swedish TV in which she confirmed that she was contacted by a producer from The Ellen DeGeneres Show. For approximately 180 seconds, she was a guest on the show on 7 April 2014 and she took home a tripod and a camera as a gift from DeGeneres. The trip was documented in a short series titled Sara Goes LA which was produced by Finnish broadcaster MTV and has also been published on YouTube since.

Other projects 
Forsberg announced her new clothing line FRSBRG in May 2015 and advertised it to her Finnish viewers with a number of well known celebrities from her home country. It was planned to be released in November the same year.

Discography

Extended plays 
 Hello I'm Saara (2016)
 Almost Acoustic (2018)

Singles

Featured

Writing credits

Filmography

References

External links 
 Sara Forsberg on Youtube
 
 Sara Forsberg on Spotify
 Sara Forsberg on Facebook
 Sara Forsberg on Instagram
 

1994 births
Finnish YouTubers
Living people
21st-century Finnish women singers
21st-century Finnish actresses
Capitol Records artists
People from Jakobstad
Finnish multi-instrumentalists
Finnish expatriates in the United States
Finnish people of Swedish descent
Finnish pop singers
English-language singers from Finland
Finnish fashion designers
Finnish female models
Finnish television presenters
Lucasfilm people
Finnish women television presenters
Finnish women fashion designers